Marla Heasley (born September 4, 1959 in Hollywood, California) is an American film and television actress best known for her role as Tawnia Baker in the 1980s hit TV series: The A-Team.

The A-Team
Heasley was cast for the role of Tawnia Baker; a newspaper reporter working with the team. Introduced in season 2 episode 15 "The Battle of Bel-Air", the character was brought in as a replacement for Melinda Culea (Amy Allen), who was abruptly dropped from the series after insisting on being given more to do.

In order to be written out of the series the character was married off in the season 3 two-part episode 2/3 "The Bend in the River". The name  of Heasley's character was stipulated by series creator: Stephen J. Cannell where he combined his daughter's first name (Tawnia) with his mother's maiden name (Baker). Some time prior to being cast as Tawnia Baker, Heasley made a guest appearance as a bikini clad co-ed called Cherise in a short-term relationship with Templeton "Faceman" Peck in season 2 episode 4 "Bad Time On The Border".

Other roles
Prior to The A-Team, Heasley appeared in the very first four episodes of Star Search in the Spokesmodel category. Heasley has made guest appearances on many other TV shows such as, T. J. Hooker, The Love Boat, Riptide, Mike Hammer, The Highwayman, and many more. She played an unnamed Air Force Lieutenant in the Galactica 1980 episode "Spaceball".

Heasley's feature film roles were The Marrying Man in 1991, and Born to Race in 1987 and Amore! in 1993.

Biography
 
Heasley grew up in Beverly Hills and went to Beverly Hills Catholic School until the age of 12, when her parents moved the family to Palm Springs. Her father Jack Heasley and uncle Bob Heasley were identical twins and professional ice skaters, known as The Heasley Twins. They skated with Sonia Henie and Dorothy Lewis and skated in their own ice revues as well. They appeared in many films, such as Dr. Seuss's The 5000 Fingers of Dr. T (1953), Ice Capades (1941), Thin Ice (1937), A Chump at Oxford (1940) and many more. They went on to become successful entertainment managers, managing the careers of Audie Murphy, Shelley Winters and more.

Heasley never wanted to go into acting, as she was raised in the entertainment business. Heasley wanted to go into fashion merchandising, but was modeling on the side while attending Orange Coast College in Costa Mesa. Her father introduced her to Norman Brokaw of William Morris Agency as a conduit for her to do commercials. She met an acting coach, Zina Provendie, while on a commercial audition, who invited Heasley to audit her class. She attended the class and fell in love with acting and sooner signed with Norman at William Morris. Even though Heasley had never acted, Brokaw said that he had a feeling about her. Norman waited to send Heasley out on auditions till she was ready. Heasley took her studying seriously by attending acting classes vigorously, joined a repertory theater and moved to New York for a year to study with an acting coach. She started working in commercials and then her first television role was in "Can You Hear the Laughter? The Freddie Prinze Story". She appeared in many guest starring roles, including, "Gallactica 1980", "Micky Spillane's Mike Hammer", "TJ Hooker", "The Love Boat" and more, before becoming a series regular on "The A-Team".

Heasley dated and lived with Wayne Newton from 1983 to 1991 and they were engaged from 1987 to 1991.

Heasley married international business entrepreneur Christopher Harriman in 2001 after dating since 1992.

References

External links

1959 births
Living people
American film actresses
American television actresses
People from Greater Los Angeles
Palm Springs High School people
21st-century American women